Kiran Digest is a Pakistani monthly publishing novel and a fictional digest from Karachi. It is a family magazine which publishes fiction.

See also 
 List of magazines in Pakistan

References 

 Siddiqui, N.Urdu Women's Digests: Reading for Pleasure behind ‘Walls and Veils’. Saarbrücken: PrintScholars’ Press, 2013.
 Siddiqui, N. Who reads Urdu women's magazines and why? An investigation of the content, purpose, production and readership of Urdu women's digests. International Journal of Media & Cultural Politics, 2012 - Intellect
 Siddiqui, N. (2014). Women's magazines in Asian and Middle Eastern countries. South Asian Popular Culture, 12(1), 29–40.

Fiction magazines
Magazines with year of establishment missing
Mass media in Karachi
Monthly magazines published in Pakistan
Literary magazines published in Pakistan
Urdu-language magazines